Allen Eugene Edwards (born December 16, 1975) is an American basketball coach and former basketball player.  He is best known for winning two NCAA championships at the University of Kentucky as a player.  Edwards was formerly the head basketball coach at the University of Wyoming.

Playing career
Edwards, a 6'5" shooting guard from Miami Senior High School in Miami, Florida, went to Kentucky to play for coach Rick Pitino.  Edwards played for the Wildcats from 1994–1998, a period where the program went 132–16, won three Southeastern Conference (SEC) championships and two national championships.  Edwards played a reserve role for the Wildcats on their 1995–96 national title team, averaging 3.3 points per game.  With the departure of Tony Delk, Edwards then moved into the starting lineup as a junior, averaging 8.6 points, 3.2 rebounds and 2.9 assists per game.  Kentucky again reached the NCAA championship game, but were upset by Arizona.  As a senior in 1997–98, Edwards averaged 9.2 points per game and led the Wildacts to their third straight NCAA title game appearance.  This time, Kentucky beat Utah to win their second title in three years.

After the conclusion of his college career, Edwards went undrafted in the 1998 NBA draft.  He instead went to the Continental Basketball Association, where he played for the Rockford Lightning.  He split the 1998–99 season between the Lightning and the Dakota Wizards of the International Basketball Association.  He played the next two seasons with the Cincinnati Stuff of the International Basketball League, until the league ceased operations in 2001.

Coaching career
Edwards returned to Kentucky in 2002 to both complete his degree and to serve as an unofficial assistant/manager to his former coach Tubby Smith with the 2002–03 Kentucky Wildcats men's basketball team. He then joined the staff of former Wildcat Kyle Macy at Morehead State as a full-time assistant coach in 2003 and remained for three seasons. From 2006 to 2009, Edwards was an assistant at VCU under Anthony Grant. Edwards then was an assistant at Towson in 2009–10 under Pat Kennedy and Western Kentucky in 2010–11 under Ken McDonald, Edwards was hired to coach Larry Shyatt's staff at Wyoming in 2011.  He was announced as the 21st head coach at the University of Wyoming on March 21, 2016. In his first year as head coach, Wyoming went 23–15 and took home the 2017 CBI championship. On March 9, 2020 it was announced that Edwards had been let go as the head basketball coach of the Wyoming Cowboys. Edwards coached the team for four years posting an overall record of 60–76 and a conference record of 24–49. On April 8, 2020, Edwards was announced as a part of Stan Johnson's first coaching staff at Loyola Marymount.

Personal life
Edwards is the younger brother of former NBA player Doug Edwards and of former Miami Hurricanes player Steve Edwards.

Head coaching record

References

External links
 Wyoming profile
 Kentucky statistics

1975 births
Living people
American men's basketball coaches
American men's basketball players
Basketball coaches from Florida
Basketball players from Miami
Cincinnati Stuff players
Kentucky Wildcats men's basketball players
Morehead State Eagles men's basketball coaches
Rockford Lightning players
Shooting guards
Small forwards
Sports coaches from Miami
Towson Tigers men's basketball coaches
VCU Rams men's basketball coaches
Western Kentucky Hilltoppers basketball coaches
Wyoming Cowboys basketball coaches
Miami Senior High School alumni